Leave It to Me is a 1955 Czech comedy film directed by Martin Frič.

Cast
 Oldřich Nový as Patocka
 Theodor Pištěk as Rokos
 František Kreuzmann as Kalousek
 Vladimír Repa as Pinc
 Bela Jurdová as Anci
 Zdeňka Baldová
 Vladimír Klemens
 Cestmír Studna

References

External links
 

1955 films
1955 comedy films
Czech comedy films
1950s Czech-language films
Czechoslovak black-and-white films
Films directed by Martin Frič
Films with screenplays by Miloš Forman
Czechoslovak comedy films
1950s Czech films